The Cup of Nestor or dove cup is a gold goblet discovered in 1876 by Heinrich Schliemann in Shaft IV of Grave Circle A, Mycenae.  The goblet is 14.5 cm high and 14.5 cm across; it weighs 295.8 grams.  It has a stem, a Vapheio cup–shaped body, and two handles in the style of a kantharos.  Each handle is decorated with a golden bird, which Schliemann observed was reminiscent of the cup of Nestor described in the Iliad.  The birds have since been identified by Spiros Marinatos as falcons, rather than the doves which are on the Iliadic cup.  J.T. Hooker suggests that the cup is an adaptation of a Cretan design made by a craftsman on the Greek mainland.

References

Works cited
 
 
 
 
 

Archaeological artifacts
Iron Age Greek art
Mycenaean Greece
Mycenae
Mycenaean art
National Archaeological Museum, Athens
Ancient Messenia
Individual ancient Greek vases
Archaeological discoveries in Greece
Ancient Greek metalwork
Gold objects